The 2019 Tai Po District Council election was held on 24 November 2019 to elect all 19 elected members to the 21-member Tai Po District Council.

The pro-democrats achieved a historic landslide victory by sweeping all the elected seats in the council amid the massive pro-democracy protests. The pro-Beijing camp was completely wiped out except for the two ex officio members who were also the rural committee chairmen.

Overall election results
Before election:
Change in composition:

Change in composition:

References

External links
 Election Results - Overall Results

2019 Hong Kong local elections